Magdalene of Brandenburg, also Magdalene and Magdalen, (7 January 1582 – 4 May 1616) was the daughter of John George, Elector of Brandenburg and his third wife Elisabeth of Anhalt-Zerbst.

Issue
She married Louis V, Landgrave of Hesse-Darmstadt in 5 June 1598, and had issue:

 Elisabeth Magdalene, Duchess of Württemberg-Montbéliard; 23 April 1600 (Darmstadt) – 9 June 1624 (Montbéliard), married Louis Frederick, Duke of Württemberg-Montbéliard.
 Anne Eleonore of Hesse-Darmstadt; 30 July 1601 – 6 May 1659.
 Marie; 11 December 1602 – 10 April 1610
 Sofie Agnes of Hesse-Darmstadt; 12 January 1604 (Darmstadt) – 8 September 1664 (Hilpoltstein).
 George II, Landgrave of Hesse-Darmstadt; 17 March 1605 – 11 June 1661.
 Juliane of Hesse; 14 April 1606 (Darmstadt) – 15 January 1659 (Hanover).
 Amalie Countess of Hesse-Darmstadt; 20 June 1607 – 11 September 1627.
 John of Hesse-Darmstadt; 17 June 1609 (Darmstadt), – 1 April 1651 (Ems).
 Henry of Hesse-Darmstadt; 1 April 1612 (Darmstadt) – 21 October 1629.
 Hedwig of Hesse-Darmstadt; 22 June 1613 Darmstadt – 2 March 1614.
 Louis of Hesse-Darmstadt; 12 September 1614 (Darmstadt) – 16 September 1614.
 Frederick of Hesse-Darmstadt; 28 February 1616 (Darmstadt) – 19 February 1682.

Ancestors

References 
 The Peerage

|-
 

  

1582 births
1616 deaths
Magdalene of Brandenburg
Magdalene of Brandenburg
Magdalene
Daughters of monarchs